Philip Bradley (born March 1885) was an American baseball player in the pre-Negro leagues playing mostly as a catcher. Most of his seasons were played for the Brooklyn Royal Giants.

Sportswriter Harry Daniels named Bradley to his 1909 "All-American Team" saying Bradley was presently "the second best catcher in colored base ball" second only to Bruce Petway. Although, Daniels noted that Bradley was a better hitter than Petway.

References

External links

Brooklyn Royal Giants players
Cuban Giants players
Matanzas players
Schenectady Mohawk Giants players
Lincoln Giants players
Sportspeople from Schenectady, New York
1885 births
Year of death missing
American expatriate baseball players in Cuba
Baseball catchers